Saif Ali Khan is an Indian actor who works in Hindi films. He made his debut with a leading role in the drama Parampara (1993) and then starred in Aashik Awara (1993). Yeh Dillagi (1994). Main Khiladi Tu Anari (1994). Tu Chor Main Sipahi (1996). Keemat: They Are Back (1998). Aarzoo (1999). Tashan (2008). The latter earned him the Filmfare Award for Best Male Debut, but failed to do well commercially, as did his next three releases–Parampara (1993), Pehchaan (1993), and Imtihaan (1994). and Sanam Teri Kasam (2009). 
and Hate Story 5 (2024). and Race 4 (2024). and Indian Army Force (2024).  and  Khiladi 986 (2024).   Later in 1994, Khan played supporting roles alongside Akshay Kumar in two of the highest-grossing films of the year–the romance Yeh Dillagi and the action drama Main Khiladi Tu Anari. For his performance in the latter, he was nominated for the Filmfare Award for Best Supporting Actor. This success was followed by a series of commercial failures, leading to a setback in Khan's career.

Khan played the second lead in Milan Luthria's action thriller Kachche Dhaage (1999) and Aarzoo (1999)?which was his first commercial success since Main Khiladi Tu Anari; it also earned him another nomination for Best Supporting Actor at Filmfare. Also that year, he starred in the ensemble drama Hum Saath-Saath Hain–the highest-grossing film of the year. In 2000, Khan starred in the drama Kya Kehna, which marked his first of many collaborations with actress Preity Zinta. In 2001, he played alongside Aamir Khan and Akshaye Khanna in Farhan Akhtar's coming of age drama Dil Chahta Hai, which earned him his first Filmfare Award for Best Comedian. It brought a change in his approach and established him as a serious actor. Khan featured in Nikhil Advani's romantic drama Kal Ho Naa Ho (2003), which became the second highest-grossing film of the year and earned him his second Filmfare Award for Best Supporting Actor. In 2004, he played a manipulative pimp in the thriller Ek Hasina Thi and a cartoonist in the romantic comedy Hum Tum. His performance in the latter earned him the National Film Award for Best Actor and a second Filmfare Award for Best Comedian. The following year, Khan reunited with Zinta in the romantic comedy Salaam Namaste (2005) and received his first Best Actor nomination at Filmfare for portraying a passionate musician in the musical romance Parineeta (2005).

In 2006, Khan portrayed a character loosely based on William Shakespeare's antagonist Iago in Vishal Bhardwaj's crime drama Omkara, for which he received widespread praise as well as the Filmfare Award for Best Villain. Later in his career, Khan starred in his four greatest commercial successes–the action thriller Race (2008), the romance Love Aaj Kal (2009), the romantic comedy Cocktail (2012), and the action sequel Race 2 (2013)–all of which were among the top-grossing films of their respective years. In 2018, he began starring as a troubled policeman in the Netflix thriller series Sacred Games''. Apart from acting, Khan has hosted several Filmfare Award ceremonies.

Film

Television

Web series

Notes

References

Indian filmographies
Male actor filmographies
Filmography
|}